Belabahali is a village located in Anandapur Block of Kendujhar district in Odisha. The PIN Code of Belabahali is 758020.

References

Villages in Kendujhar district